The 2015 Comerica Bank Challenger was a professional tennis tournament played on hard courts. It was the 28th edition of the tournament which was part of the 2015 ATP Challenger Tour. It took place in Aptos, California, United States between 10 and 16 August 2015.

Singles main-draw entrants

Seeds

 1 Rankings are as of August 3, 2015.

Other entrants
The following players received wildcards into the singles main draw:
  Jared Donaldson
  Taylor Harry Fritz 
  Tommy Haas 
  Mitchell Krueger

The following players entered into the singles main draw as alternates:
  Dennis Novikov
  Alexander Sarkissian

The following players received entry from the qualifying draw:
  Daniel Nguyen
  Tennys Sandgren
  Zhang Ze
  Mischa Zverev

The following players received entry as a lucky loser:
  Takuto Niki

Champions

Singles

  John Millman def.  Austin Krajicek, 7–5, 2–6, 6–3

Doubles

  Chris Guccione /  Artem Sitak def.  Yuki Bhambri /  Matthew Ebden, 6–4, 7–6(7–2)

References
Official Website

External links
ITF Search
ATP official site

Comerica Bank Challenger
Nordic Naturals Challenger
COmerica
Com